Mitsuko Kandori (born 5 May 1943) is a Japanese gymnast. She competed in six events at the 1968 Summer Olympics.

References

External links
 

1943 births
Living people
Japanese female artistic gymnasts
Olympic gymnasts of Japan
Gymnasts at the 1968 Summer Olympics
Gymnasts from Tokyo